Göta Wing, also F 9 Säve, or simply F 9, was a Swedish Air Force wing with the main base located near Gothenburg in south-west Sweden.

History
The decision to set up the air wing was made in 1936 to defend the import/export harbours on the west coast. The wing itself was not commissioned until October 1, 1940 and the airfield took until 1941 to complete.

Initially, two squadrons of J 8 fighters were commissioned in 1940, but they were quickly replaced by three squadrons of J 11s.

In 1942 hangars and some of the base command were relocated inside large shelters blasted out of the rocks. Initially the shelter area was only 8,000 m² (72,000 sq ft.) but it was later extended to 22,000 m² (200,000 sq ft.) 30 m (100 ft) below ground level.

During 1943, the J 11s were replaced by J 22s and subsequently by J 21s in 1946. The J 21s served for only three years until 1949 when they were replaced by the J 28B.

After yet only two years the J 28Bs were in turn replaced by the J 29. The 29 Tunnan did serve for over ten years until they were finally replaced by the J 34 where some units came from Svea Wing (F 8) and Södertörn Wing (F 18).

The squadrons were gradually decommissioned one per year 1967-1969 until the wing itself was decommissioned on June 30, 1969.

The airfield later operated as Gothenburg City Airport.

The old mountain hangars house the Aeroseum museum.

Barracks and training areas
The wing was first based at F 7 and from 16 June 1941 on the Säve Airfield at Hisingen in the City of Gothenburg. The runway system comprised three runways and the wing had two underground hangars; one from 1944 and one from 1955.

Heraldry and traditions

Coat of arms
Blazon: "The coat of arms of Gothenburg, azure, with waves argent six times divided bendy-sinister argent, charged with a double-tailed crowned lion rampant or, armed and langued gules".

Colours, standards and guidons
The colour of the wing was presented by His Royal Highness Crown Prince Gustaf Adolf at the Säve Airfield on 13 October 1941. Blazon: "On blue cloth in the centre the badge of the Air Force; a winged two-bladed propeller under a royal crown proper, all in yellow. In the first corner a rampant yellow lion with an open crown." Decor through inserting and embroidery.

Commanding officers
Commanding officers from 1940 to 1969. The commanding officer was referred to as flottiljchef ("wing commander") and had the rank of colonel.

1940–1948: Magnus Bång
1948–1959: Arthur Åhmansson
1959–1960: Åke Mangård
1960–1969: Ulf Cappelen-Smith

Names, designations and locations

See also
 Swedish Air Force
 List of military aircraft of Sweden
 Underground hangar

Footnotes

References

Notes

Print

Web

Further reading

External links

 Webpage listing all air force squadrons in Sweden
 Aeroseum flight museum inside the old base shelter

Wings of the Swedish Air Force
Military units and formations established in 1940
Military units and formations disestablished in 1969
1940 establishments in Sweden
1969 disestablishments
Hisingen
Bunkers in Europe
Gothenburg Garrison
Disbanded units and formations of Sweden